Ivan Jurišić (born 15 March 1956) is a retired Serbian footballer who played as a defender.

He played for Red Star Belgrade and PAOK.

References
 
 forum.b92.net
 RSSSF.com
 RSSSF.com

1956 births
Living people
Sportspeople from Zrenjanin
Serbian footballers
Yugoslav footballers
Serbian expatriate footballers
Yugoslav First League players
Super League Greece players
FK Proleter Zrenjanin players
Red Star Belgrade footballers
PAOK FC players
Apollon Pontou FC players
Expatriate footballers in Greece
Association football defenders